Joseph John Fisher White (1 May 1865 – 14 January 1945) was a British stage and film actor. The eldest of four sons of Rev. John White, of Ampfield, of that family formerly of Hursley, by his wife Martha, daughter of Rev. John Fisher, he took a B.A. from the University of Oxford.

White developed a reputation for playing character roles in the theatre and began to appear in a significant number of British films from the early 1920s onwards. He was the uncle of the actor Wilfrid Hyde-White, and was survived by a son, Hilary Fisher White (b. 1902) and a daughter, Thalia Fisher White (b. 1906), from his marriage to Edith Rhoda Blackwood.

Selected filmography
 Damaged Goods (1919)
 Diana of the Crossways (1922)
 A Tale of Two Cities (1922)
 Owd Bob (1924)
 One Colombo Night (1926)
 The Island of Despair (1926)
 The Only Way (1927)
 Balaclava (1928)
 The City of Youth (1928)
 The Last Post (1929)
 Lily of Killarney (1929)
 Loose Ends (1930)
 Kissing Cup's Race (1930)
 Madame Guillotine (1931)
 A Man of Mayfair (1931)
 The Good Companions (1933)
 The Great Defender (1934)
 What Happened Then? (1934)
 The Old Curiosity Shop (1934)
 Turn of the Tide (1935)
 City of Beautiful Nonsense (1935)
 Hearts of Humanity (1936)
 Little Miss Somebody (1937)
 Dreaming Lips (1937)
 The Man Who Made Diamonds (1937)
 Under the Red Robe (1937)
 Pastor Hall (1940)

Bibliography
 Kruger, Loren. The National Stage: Theatre and Cultural Legitimation in England, France, and America. University of Chicago Press, 1992.
 Richards, Jeffrey (ed.). The Unknown 1930s: An Alternative History of the British Cinema, 1929-1939. I.B Tauris, 2001.
 Fox-Davies, Arthur Charles. Armorial families: a directory of gentlemen of coat armour (seventh edition), vol. 2. Hurst and Blackett, 1929

References

External links

1865 births
1945 deaths
Male actors from Bristol
English male film actors
English male stage actors
20th-century English male actors